Prathijnja is a 1983 Indian Malayalam-language film, directed by P. N. Sundaram and produced by C. S. Unni and P. K. Chidambaran. The film stars Prem Nazir, Srividya, Mammootty and Jagathy Sreekumar. The film's score was composed by Ben Surendar.

Cast

Prem Nazir as Prabhu/Prabhakaran
Srividya as Lakshmi
Mammootty as Hamsa
Jagathy Sreekumar as Anthappan
Pattom Sadan as Charayam Paramu
Prem Prakash as Police Officer
Prathapachandran as Moosa
Balan K. Nair as Gopalan /K. R. G. Panikkar
Jalaja as Sainaba
Nissam as Gunda
P. R. Menon as Usha's father
Silk Smitha as Dancer
Thodupuzha Radhakrishnan as Samuel
Shanavas as Ravindran
Mafia Sasi as Kochumuthalali
Santo Krishnan as Gunda

Soundtrack
The music was composed by Ben Surendar with lyrics by Poovachal Khader and R. K. Damodaran.

References

External links
 

1983 films
1980s Malayalam-language films